Hot Tamale is a 2006 American comedy-drama film directed by Michael Damian, co-written by Janeen Damian. It stars Randy Spelling, Diora Baird and Carmen Electra. The film opened on April 23, 2006, and the DVD was released on August 29, 2006. The film is Michael Damian's feature film directorial debut.

Plot
Harlan Woodruff (Randy Spelling) is a Salsa musician from Wyoming, on a road trip to Los Angeles to realise his dream of making it big as a percussionist. It is revealed that Harlan had a troubled childhood, having found his dead father frozen in a fishing hole. En route to Los Angeles, he runs into Jude (Jason Priestley), a career criminal on the run from two hit men, Al and Dwayne (Mike Starr and Sean Blakemore), who want to retrieve stolen merchandise from him. Desperate, Jude dumps the merchandise into Harlan's bag and escapes.

Harlan, meanwhile, stays over at his Puerto Rican friend Carlo's apartment. He meets Tuesday (Diora Baird), a friend of Carlos there. Carlos leaves town on an assignment and Tuesday and Harlan have the apartment to themselves. Harlan discovers that Carlo is a marijuana cultivator, growing the plants at his house. When trying to smoke the substance, he has a panic attack and lands in the hospital. After making a recovery, Tuesday brings him back to the apartment, where they sleep in. Meanwhile, Al and Dwayne catch up with Jude, who spills his guts that the bag the hit men are looking for is with Harlan. Jude's partner Riley (Carmen Electra) is also hot on Harlans trail.

The hitmen and Riley have their own demands and want the stolen merchandise, which turns out to be diamonds. A shoot out ensues and finally the hitmen are nabbed and Harlan walks away from the fire fight unharmed with Tuesday.

Cast
 Randy Spelling as Harlan Woodriff, the naive salsa musician from Wyoming.
 Diora Baird as Tuesday Blackwell, the damsel in distress.
 Carmen Electra as Riley, a con woman and thief.
 Jason Priestley as Jude, Riley's partner in crime.
 Mike Starr as Al
 James Best as Hank Larson
 Richard Riehle as Sheriff Pinkham 
 Sean Blakemore as Dewayne Longfellow
 Beth Grant as Dori Woodriff
 Christian Boewe as Young Harlan
 Matt Cedeño as Caesar Lopez
 Kristen Caldwell as Bitsy
 Sandy Martin as Ed the Diner Cook

Reception

Critical response
The movie was mostly panned by critics, with a few exceptions. Positive takeaways were performances of Randy Spelling and the debut direction effort of Michael Damian.

Awards
The film won the Boston International Film Festival Best Narrative feature Award for Michael Damian and Janeen Damian. It also won the Festival Prize at the Dixie Film Festival.

References

External links

2006 films
2006 comedy-drama films
American comedy-drama films
Films directed by Michael Damian
2006 directorial debut films
2000s English-language films
2000s American films